Diocese of Šibenik may refer to:

 Roman Catholic Diocese of Šibenik, a diocese of the Catholic Church in Croatia, with seat in the city of Šibenik.
 Eastern Orthodox Diocese of Šibenik, former common name of the current Serbian Orthodox Eparchy of Dalmatia, during the period when its seat was in the city of Šibenik.

See also
Šibenik
Catholic Church in Croatia
Eastern Orthodoxy in Croatia
Diocese of Zadar (disambiguation)
Diocese of Zagreb (disambiguation)
Diocese of Požega (disambiguation)